Park College of Engineering and Technology is a college of engineering situated in Kaniyur,  from the Coimbatore International Airport, in Tamil Nadu, India. It is affiliated to Anna University, Chennai, which is the top 5th university of India and approved by All India Council for Technical Education. The college has been accorded ISO 9002 Certificate.

History 
The Park College of Engineering and Technology was started in 1997 and is situated on the National Highway NH 47 in Kaniyur, 28 km east from the industrial city of Coimbatore in Tamil Nadu. It is located on 30 acres of land surrounded by green fields and coconut groves on its three sides, and industry on the other.

The college is affiliated to Anna University, Chennai, and is approved by AICTE, Delhi and NBA (National Board of Accreditation). It is an ISO Certified Institution. The Director of Technical Education of the Government of Tamil Nadu is the supervisory authority over the college. The college is a co-educational self-financed private institution.

The college is located not far from the industrial city of Coimbatore.

Academics 
Undergraduate courses 

 B.E. Aeronautical Engineering         
 B.E. Mechanical Engineering
 B.E. Electrical and Electronics Engineering
 B.E. Computer Science and Engineering
 B.Tech. Information Technology
 B.E. Electronics and Communication Engineering
 B.Tech Textiles Technology

P.G courses 

 MCA - Master of Computer Applications
 M.E - Aeronautical Engineering
 M.E - Engineering Design
 MBA - Master of Business Administration

External links 
 Park College website

Engineering colleges in Coimbatore
All India Council for Technical Education